Bunocephalus is a genus of banjo catfishes from South America. It is found in Magdalena, Orinoco, Amazon, Paraguay-Paraná, and São Francisco Rivers. It is also the only aspredinid genus found west of the Andes, found in the Atrato, San Juan, and Patía Rivers. This genus is a part of the family Aspredinidae, known as banjo catfishes for their large, flattened heads and slender tails that give the appearance of a banjo. Most species exhibit cryptic coloration, and the same holds true among Bunocephalus species. The skin is completely keratinized and is covered by large, unculiferous tubercles. Bunocephalus species may reach up to 13 centimetres SL.

Species
There are currently 12 recognized species in this genus:
 Bunocephalus aleuropsis Cope, 1870
 Bunocephalus amaurus C. H. Eigenmann, 1912 (Camouflaged catfish)
 Bunocephalus chamaizelus C. H. Eigenmann, 1912
 Bunocephalus colombianus C. H. Eigenmann, 1912
 Bunocephalus coracoideus (Cope, 1874) (Guitarrita)
 Bunocephalus doriae Boulenger, 1902
 Bunocephalus erondinae A. R. Cardoso, 2010
 Bunocephalus hartti T. P. Carvalho, A. R. Cardoso, Friel & R. E. dos Reis, 2015 
 Bunocephalus knerii Steindachner, 1882 (Ecuador banjo catfish)
 Bunocephalus larai R. Ihering (pt), 1930
 Bunocephalus minerim T. P. Carvalho, A. R. Cardoso, Friel & R. E. dos Reis, 2015 
 Bunocephalus verrucosus (Walbaum, 1792) (Gnarled catfish)

The removal of Pseudobunocephalus from Bunocephalus was an attempt to make it monophyletic. Even in this reduced state, Bunocephalus is still the largest genus in the Aspredinidae.

In the aquarium
B. coracoideus is the most common species of banjo catfish found in the aquarium fishkeeping hobby. These fish are nocturnal. This species is peaceful and a good idea for a community aquarium. These fish may be kept with sand to allow them to bury themselves or with a flat rock to hide underneath. Reproduction has been accomplished in the home aquarium. These fish can be easily sexed because females are much fatter and fuller than males. The mating pair should be conditioned on live foods for at least a month. Spawning is induced by a larger water change; the pair will spawn within two days. Spawning occurs at night. Some sources say they spawn under a fallen leaf or on a large rock, incubating their eggs by sitting on them, while others list them as egg-scatterers.

References

Aspredinidae
Fish of the Amazon basin
Catfish genera
Taxa named by Rudolf Kner